Nizhneatashevo (Tübänge Ataş) is a rural locality (a selo) in Semiletovsky Selsoviet, Dyurtyulinsky District, Bashkortostan, Russia. The population was 521 as of 2010. There are 4 streets.

Geography 
Nizhneatashevo is located 17 km southwest of Dyurtyuli (the district's administrative centre) by road. Tashtau is the nearest rural locality.

References 

Rural localities in Dyurtyulinsky District